Dame Rose Tremain  (born 2 August 1943) is an English novelist, short story writer, and former Chancellor of the University of East Anglia.

Life
Rose Tremain was born Rosemary Jane Thomson on 2 August 1943 in London to  Viola Mabel Thomson and Keith Nicholas Home Thomson. Her paternal great-grandfather is William Thomson, who was Archbishop of York from 1862 to 1890.

She was educated at Francis Holland School, Crofton Grange School, the Sorbonne (1961–1962) and the University of East Anglia (BA, English Literature). She later went on to teach creative writing at the University of East Anglia from 1988 to 1995, and was appointed Chancellor in 2013.

She married Jon Tremain in 1971 and they had one daughter, Eleanor, born in 1972, who became an actress. The marriage lasted about five years. Her second marriage, to theatre director Jonathan Dudley, in 1982, lasted about nine years; and she has been with Richard Holmes since 1992. She lives in Thorpe St Andrew near Norwich in Norfolk.

Writing
Her influences include William Golding, author of Lord of the Flies, and Gabriel Garcia Marquez's 1967 novel 100 Years of Solitude and the magical realism style.

She is a historical novelist who approaches her subjects "from unexpected angles, concentrating her attention on unglamorous outsiders."

In 2009, she donated the short story The Jester of Astapovo to Oxfam's "Ox-Tales" project, four collections of UK stories written by 38 authors. Her story was published in the "Earth" collection.

She became a Fellow of the Royal Society of Literature in 1983. Already Commander of the Order of the British Empire (CBE), Tremain was appointed Dame Commander of the Order of the British Empire (DBE) in the 2020 New Year Honours for services to writing.

Awards and honours
1984 Dylan Thomas Prize
1984 Giles Cooper Award, Temporary Shelter (play)
1989 Sunday Express Book of the Year, Restoration
1989 Booker Prize, shortlist, Restoration
1992 James Tait Black Memorial Prize, Sacred Country
1994 Prix Femina Étranger, Sacred Country
1999 Whitbread Award, Music and Silence
2008 Orange Prize, The Road Home
2012 Wellcome Trust Book Prize, shortlist, Merivel: A Man of His Time
2013 Walter Scott Prize for Historical Fiction, shortlist, Merivel: A Man of His Time
2016 National Jewish Book Award for The Gustav Sonata
2016 Costa Book Awards (novel), shortlist, The Gustav Sonata
2017 Baileys Women’s Prize for Fiction, longlist, The Gustav Sonata
2017 Ribalow Prize for The Gustav Sonata

Selected bibliography

Novels
 Sadler's Birthday (1976), 
 Letter to Sister Benedicta (1978), 
 The Cupboard (1981), 
 Journey to the Volcano (1985), 
 The Swimming Pool Season (1985), 
 Restoration (1989), 
 Sacred Country (1992), 
 The Way I Found Her (1997), 
 Music and Silence (1999), 
 The Colour (2003), 
 The Road Home (2008), 
 Trespass (2010 W.W. Norton), 
 Merivel: A Man of His Time (2012), 
 The Gustav Sonata (2016), 
 Islands of Mercy (2020), 
 Lily: A Tale of Revenge (2021),

Collections of short stories
 The Colonel's Daughter and other stories (1983)
 The Garden of the Villa Mollini and other stories (1987)
 Evangelista's Fan and Other Stories (1994)
 The Darkness of Wallis Simpson and other stories (2006)
 The American Lover (2014)

For children
  Journey to the Volcano (1985)

Memoir
 Rosie: Scenes from a Vanished Life (2018)

References

External links
 Susanna Rustin, "Costume dramatist", The Guardian, 10 May 2003.
 Blake Wilson, "Stray Questions for: Rose Tremain" (interview), The New York Times, 15 May 2009.
 Sian Cain, "Costa book award 2016 shortlists dominated by female writers", The Guardian,, 22 November 2016.

1943 births
Living people
People educated at Francis Holland School
20th-century English novelists
21st-century English novelists
Alumni of the University of East Anglia
Academics of the University of East Anglia
Chancellors of the University of East Anglia
Dames Commander of the Order of the British Empire
Costa Book Award winners
English women novelists
Fellows of the Royal Society of Literature
James Tait Black Memorial Prize recipients
Prix Femina Étranger winners
University of Paris alumni
Writers from London
21st-century English women writers
20th-century English women writers
Writers from Norfolk
People from Thorpe St Andrew